Sage Creek High School is a public high school in Carlsbad, California. It opened in the fall of 2013 and is located in a coastal suburb of San Diego. Sage Creek specializes in the STEM fields and was created to alleviate growing enrollment at Carlsbad High School. Although the school is public, a lottery for admission is held if a class reaches a certain threshold. Sage Creek offers Wrestling, Lacrosse, Tennis, Volleyball, Girls' Field Hockey, Basketball, Cross Country, Track and Field, Golf, Boys' Baseball, Girls' Softball, Soccer, and Swimming.

Campus
Sage Creek is a verified CHPS school, this means the school includes many renewable materials, water, and electricity saving technologies. The roughly 40-acre campus cost over $100 million to build, and includes 3 parking lots, 4 academic buildings, and several sport courts. A 17,500 square foot Performing Arts Center (PAC) opened in June 2018.

Achievements, awards, distinctions 
The California Interscholastic Federation (CIF) is the governing body for high school sports in California.

Men's Cross Country
 2016  - Boys' Cross Country Team received 2nd in the California State CIF Championship division 4.

Women's Cross Country
 2018  - Girls' Cross Country Team received 1st in the California State CIF Championship division 4.

Men's Volleyball
 2017 - State Championship - Boys' Volleyball California Regional CIF Division 3. Carlsbad’s First State Champion in any sport

Surf
 2016 - Surf Team won their division taking a 4-0 undefeated season victory.

Project Design Awards 
 2013 ABC, Award of Excellence
 2013 ENR California Best Project Award, K-12 category
 2013 AGC Build San Diego Merit Award, Excellence in Sustainable Project category
 2014 ASCE, Award of Excellence, Land Development
 2014 APWA, Project of the Year for Structures, Sustainable/Green and Projects More than $75 Million

Science Olympiad
 2016 10th place in San Diego Regional Science Olympiad Competition
 2017 7th place in San Diego Regional Science Olympiad Competition
 2019 5th place in San Diego Regional Science Olympiad Competition

Robotics
Sage Creek has four award-winning FTC teams. They are Botcats, LevelUp 9261, Crow Force 5, and Python. In 2022, three would compete in the San Diego regional tournament which is equivalent to a state or national level tournament.

STEM
Sage Creek has programs in the STEM fields, including four-year Biomedical and Engineering strands through Project Lead the Way.

References

External links
 School Homepage

Carlsbad, California
High schools in San Diego County, California
Public high schools in California
2013 establishments in California
Educational institutions established in 2013